Stewartry RFC is a rugby union side based in Castle Douglas, Dumfries and Galloway, Scotland.They field a Men's and Women's XV and 7 different youth sides.  They play their home games at Greenlaw.

History

There was a previous Stewartry rugby club, active in the 1920s. They played their last game in 1930. They played at Kirkchrist Park.

The present club was founded in 1970.

The Women's XV are known as the Stewartry Sirens. They are very successful; having won the National Plate competition on three occasions.

The Men's XV play against Annan RFC for the Chisholm Cup; the local derby match.

Stewartry born and bred Suzy Mckerlie-Hex amassed 13 caps for Scotland:-

Suzanne Mckerlie-Hex 
Scotland Women record: 13 caps.

2011: Sp(r) E(r) It(r) Ned(r)
2012: E(r) W
2013: E(r) It(r) I(r) W(r) F(r) FIRA[Ned Sw(r)]

Stewartry Sevens

The club run the Stewartry Sevens. The Sevens tournament was founded in 1972.

Notable former players

Men

Glasgow Warriors

The following former Stewartry players represented Glasgow Warriors.

Scotland

The following former Stewartry players represented Scotland.

Women

Scotland

The following former Stewartry players represented Scotland.

Honours

Women

National Plate
Winners: 2014–15, 2016–17, 2018–19
Hannah Tulley Cup
Winners: 2014–15

Men

 Glasgow Division One
 Winners: 1977-78
 National Division Five
 Winners: 1991-92
 National Division Four
 Winners: 1992-93
Chisholm Cup 
Winners: 2014-15
 Ardrossan Sevens
 Winners: 1994
 Wigtownshire Sevens
 Winners: 1994
 Stewartry Sevens
 Winners: 1973, 1982

Youth

 West Regional U16 Plate
 Runners up(Losing 67-3 to Marr Rugby): 2022

References 

Rugby union in Dumfries and Galloway
Scottish rugby union teams
Castle Douglas